Aperture Desk Job is a 2022 action game by Valve. A spin-off of the Portal series, it was released concurrently with the Steam Deck as a tech demo showcasing the platform's controller functions.

Gameplay 
The gameplay consists of product inspection aided by Grady, an artificial intelligence "core" much like many others seen in the Portal franchise. The game serves as a tech demo for the Steam Deck, with most of the game taking place in front of a desk that acts as an in-world representation of the console. A few different scenarios are used to test different functions of the controls, such as a shooting segment making use of gyroscopic control, or a situation where the player must write their name making use of the Steam Deck's touchscreen. The game could also be played on standard computer hardware with the use of a game controller.

Synopsis 
The player, whose name is up to them to decide, starts work at Aperture as a product tester at a desk that from that point on they seem incapable of leaving. A core named Grady (Nate Bargatze) arrives and tasks the player with testing toilets. A defective toilet destroys a transport pipe filled with ammunition, filling the cistern with bullets which the toilet the fires off. Inspired, Grady decides to try and pitch a new idea to the heads of Aperture.

Six months later, Grady introduces a turret cobbled together from weapon parts and the shell of a toilet. He urges the player to test it out and the player ends up destroying the warehouse. Grady leaves the player to take the fall while he attempts to improve the design of the turret. Eighteen months later the player is released from Aperture prison, and Grady has become a parole officer in order to monitor them. Grady enthusiastically urges them back to work to test his new and improved turret on appliances stolen from the Housewares Department. He claims that he has organized a meeting with CEO Cave Johnson (J. K. Simmons), and as they journey to Johnson's office on the 80th floor Grady fantasizes about spending the money they are going to make on paying back the loan sharks he used to fund the turret's development. They are suddenly attacked by appliances modelled into (far superior) turrets by Housewares engineers. The player battles through an onslaught of appliance turrets, before using the desk's inbuilt rocket propulsion system to speed them to the top floor.

Upon reaching Johnson's office, Grady reveals that he lied about organizing the meeting and that he suspects Johnson is a recluse, given that no-one has seen him in years. Upon entering his office, it's revealed that Johnson no longer exists as a physical being—he was stricken with a terrible disease years prior and had his consciousness uploaded into a supercomputer designed to look like a giant statue of his head. Having lived this way for years, he begs the player to kill him; the player and Grady oblige by using the turret to at first try to destroy the head's clay shell before eventually shutting off the power supply. At first this seems to work, only for the backup power to turn Johnson back on, prompting him to fire the two. However, the weight of his head and damage caused by the player causes him to fall through the floor all the way to the bottom of the building.

Months later, Grady and the player have entered into a witness protection program having informed on Grady's loan sharks, and now go by "Gary" and "Charlie". The two of them still 'work' in the damaged Aperture building, with the player 'testing' toilets that simply fall off the conveyor belt into a hole in the floor caused by Johnson's falling head. The head, along with several other toilet turrets, are briefly given power by an advanced device created by a colony of praying mantises that infest the building, and they perform a choir song over the credits together.

Development 
Aperture Desk Job was developed by Valve on the Source 2 engine as a tech demo for the Steam Deck. It was released for free on March 1, 2022.

Reception
Rock Paper Shotgun praised the humor of the game.

References 

2022 video games
Action video games
Windows games
Portal (series)
Valve Corporation games
Source 2 games
Simulation video games
Single-player video games
Video games developed in the United States